The Odense Letbane (English: Odense Tramway) is a tram system in Odense, Denmark. The first phase opened on 28 May 2022. The tramway starts in Tarup, in the north-western part of Odense, and travels via the central train station, University of Southern Denmark, and the new hospital before reaching its final destination in Hjallese, in the southernmost part of the city. Expected number of passengers is 34,000 daily. The total budget is 3.3 billion Danish krone (2017 numbers). The tramway is financed by the Odense Municipality, the Danish State, and the Region of Southern Denmark. 

The City Council has decided to work towards establishing a second line. However, there is no construction regulation or co-financing from the Danish state .

History

The political process 
The tramway in Odense was suggested for the first time in 2008 by the then mayor, the late Jan Boye. Since then Odense Municipality and the Region of Southern Denmark have been working on the project, which was unanimously backed up by the city council. A formal agreement between the State, the Region of Southern Denmark and Odense Municipality dated 23 June 2014, constituted the official declaration of financial support to the tramway project by the State and the Region. 

On 5 February 2015, the construction regulation "Law on Odense Letbane" was approved by the Danish parliament, Folketinget, after which it was possible to form a construction company Odense Letbane P/S to implement the project.

Planning 
In August 2012, the competition for the design and visualization consultancy for the Odense Tramway was won by a team consisting of Niras, PLH Architects, Atelier Villes & Paysages and MBD Design.

In March 2015, Parsons Brinckerhoff won the contract for project management, and strategic and economic advice.  COWI was selected as technical advisor.

Construction 
All utilities (pipes, cables i.e.) were moved before the actual construction work commenced. These works lasted from April 2015 until December 2017. 

To make space for the tramway, it is necessary to relocate the roads, bike lanes, and pavements. The tramway needs eight meters width for the tramway tracks. The work commenced in August 2017 and construction of new roads, bike lanes, and pavements continues until spring 2019. This work is carried out by the three Danish contractors Arkil, M.J. Eriksson, and Barslund. The next phase is the track work where the contractors establish the tracks with foundations, drainage, and cables. The Spanish company COMSA is the contractor for this part of the project, collaborating with their sub-contractors Munck (Denmark), EFACEC (Portugal) and IDOM (Spain). Last part of the project is the test and trial run of the tramway. This will be carried out during 2019 and 2020 by the assigned operator which is also in charge of maintenance. The contract for operation and maintenance is expected to be closed by the end of 2018. The Swiss-German tram company Stadler Pankow delivers 16 trams of the model Variobahn for the Odense Tramway project.

Operation 
According to the current schedule, the tram will run daily from 05:00 until 24:00 on weekdays and until 01:00 during weekends. During working hours, the tram will run every 7.5 minutes, and during evenings, it will run every 15 minutes. Runtime between the two terminals will be 42 minutes. As such average speed is roughly 

The first tram was delivered in February 2020.

References

External links 
Official website

Transport in Odense
Transport in Funen
Tram transport in Denmark
Railway lines opened in 2022